This is a list of mammal species found in Kerala, India.

Order: Artiodactyla

Family: Bovidae

Genus: Bos

Species: Bos gaurus (gaur / കാട്ടുപോത്ത്)

Genus: Nilgiritragus

Species: Nilgiritragus hylocrius (Nilgiri tahr / വരയാട്)

Genus: Tetracerus

Species: Tetracerus quadricornis (four-horned antelope / ഉല്ലമാൻ)

Family: Cervidae

Genus: Axis

Species: Axis axis (chital / പുള്ളിമാൻ)

Genus: Muntiacus

Species: Muntiacus muntjak (Indian muntjac / കേഴമാൻ)

Genus: Rusa

Species: Rusa unicolor (sambar deer / മ്ലാവ്)

Family: Suidae

Genus: Sus

Species: Sus scrofa cristatus (Indian boar / കാട്ടുപന്നി)

Family: Tragulidae

Genus: Moschiola

Species: Moschiola indica (Indian spotted chevrotain / കൂരമാൻ)

Order: Carnivora

Family: Canidae

Genus: Canis

Species: Canis aureus naria (Sri Lankan jackal / കുറുനരി )

Genus: Cuon

Species: Cuon alpinus (Dhole / ചെന്നായ)

Genus: Vulpes

Species: Vulpes bengalensis (Bengal fox / കുറുക്കൻ)

Family: Felidae

Genus: Felis

Species: Felis chaus (jungle cat / കാട്ടുമാക്കാൻ / കാട്ടുപൂച്ച)

Genus: Panthera

Species: Panthera pardus fusca (Indian leopard / ഇന്ത്യൻ പുള്ളിപ്പുലി)

Species: Panthera tigris tigris (Bengal tiger / ബംഗാൾ കടുവ)

Genus: Prionailurus

Species: Prionailurus bengalensis (leopard cat / പൂച്ചപ്പുലി)

Species: Prionailurus rubiginosus (rusty-spotted cat / തുരുമ്പൻ പൂച്ച)

Family: Herpestidae

Genus: Urva

Species: Urva edwardsii (Indian grey mongoose / നാടൻ കീരി)

Species: Urva fusca (Indian brown mongoose / തവിടൻ കീരി)

Species: Urva smithii (ruddy mongoose / ചുണയൻ_കീരി)

Species: Urva vitticolla (stripe-necked mongoose / ചെങ്കീരി)

Family: Mustelidae

Genus: Aonyx

Species: Aonyx cinerea (Asian small-clawed otter / മല നീർനായ)

Genus: Lutrogale

Species: Lutrogale perspicillata (smooth-coated otter / സ്മൂത്ത്-കോട്ടഡ് നീർനായ)

Genus: Martes

Species: Martes gwatkinsii (Nilgiri marten / മരനായ)

Family: Ursidae

Genus: Melursus

Species: Melursus ursinus (sloth bear / തേൻകരടി)

Family: Viverridae

Genus: Paradoxurus

Species: Paradoxurus hermaphroditus (Asian palm civet / മരപ്പട്ടി)

Species: Paradoxurus jerdoni (brown palm civet / തവിടൻ വെരുക്)

Genus: Viverricula

Species: Viverricula indica (small Indian civet / പൂവെരുക്)

Order: Cetacea

Family: Balaenopteridae

Genus: Balaenoptera

Species: Balaenoptera acutorostrata (common minke whale / ചെറുതിമിംഗലം)

Species: Balaenoptera borealis (sei whale / ചാരത്തിമിംഗിലം)

Species: Balaenoptera brydei/edeni (Bryde's whale / ബ്രൈഡന്റെ തിമിംഗിലം)

Species: Balaenoptera musculus (blue whale / നീലത്തിമിംഗിലം)

Species: Balaenoptera physalus (fin whale / ചിറകൻ തിമിംഗിലം)

Genus: Megaptera

Species: Megaptera novaeangliae (humpback whale / കൂനൻ തിമിംഗിലം)

Family: Delphinidae

Genus: Delphinus

Species: Delphinus capensis (long-beaked common dolphin)

Genus: Feresa

Species: Feresa attenuata (pygmy killer whale / ചിന്ന കൊലയാളിത്തിമിംഗലം)

Genus: Globicephala

Species: Globicephala macrorhynchus (short-finned pilot whale / ചെറുചിറകൻ തിമിംഗലം)

Genus: Grampus

Species: Grampus griseus (Risso's dolphin)

Genus: Lagenodelphis

Species: Lagenodelphis hosei (Fraser's dolphin / ആഴക്കടൽ ഡോൾഫിൻ)

Genus: Orcinus

Species: Orcinus orca (killer whale / കൊലയാളിത്തിമിംഗലം)

Genus: Peponocephala

Species: Peponocephala electra (melon-headed whale / മത്തങ്ങാത്തലയൻ തിമിംഗലം)

Genus: Pseudorca

Species: Pseudorca crassidens (false killer whale / കപട കൊലയാളിത്തിമിംഗലം)

Genus: Sousa

Species: Sousa chinensis (Indo-Pacific humpbacked dolphin)

Genus: Stenella

Species: Stenella attenuata (pantropical spotted dolphin / പുള്ളി ഡോൾഫിൻ)

Species: Stenella coeruleoalba (striped dolphin / വരയൻ ഡോൾഫിൻ)

Species: Stenella longirostris (spinner dolphin)

Genus: Steno

Species: Steno bredanensis (rough-toothed dolphin / പരുക്കൻപല്ലൻ ഡോൾഫിൻ)

Genus: Tursiops

Species: Tursiops aduncus (Indo-Pacific bottlenose dolphin)

Species: Tursiops truncatus (common bottlenose dolphin / കുപ്പിമൂക്കൻ ഡോൾഫിൻ)

Family: Kogiidae

Genus: Kogia

Species: Kogia breviceps (pygmy sperm whale / കുഞ്ഞൻ എണ്ണത്തിമിംഗിലം)

Species: Kogia sima (dwarf sperm whale)

Family: Phocoenidae

Genus: Neophocaena

Species: Neophocaena phocaenoides (finless porpoise / എലിയനേടി)

Family: Physeteridae

Genus: Physeter

Species: Physeter macrocephalus (sperm whale / എണ്ണത്തിമിംഗിലം)

Family: Ziphiidae

Genus: Indopacetus

Species: Indopacetus pacificus (tropical bottlenose whale)

Genus: Mesoplodon

Species: Mesoplodon densirostris (Blainville's beaked whale / ചുണ്ടൻ തിമിംഗിലം / കൊമ്പൻ തിമിംഗിലം)

Species: Mesoplodon ginkgodens (ginkgo-toothed beaked whale / ജിങ്കോ തിമിംഗിലം)

Species: Mesoplodon hotaula (Deraniyagala's beaked whale)

Genus: Ziphius

Species: Ziphius cavirostris (Cuvier's beaked whale / കുവിയറുടെ ചുണ്ടൻ തിമിംഗിലം)

Order: Chiroptera

Family: Emballonuridae

Genus: Saccolaimus

Species: Saccolaimus saccolaimus (naked-rumped pouched bat / സഞ്ചിവാഹി ഉറവാലൻവാവൽ)

Genus: Taphozous

Species: Taphozous melanopogon (black-bearded tomb bat / കരിന്താടി ഉറവാലൻവാവൽ)

Species: Taphozous longimanus (long-winged tomb bat)

Family: Hipposideridae

Genus: Hipposideros

Species: Hipposideros ater (dusky leaf-nosed bat)

Species: Hipposideros fulvus (fulvus roundleaf bat / തവിടൻ ഇലമൂക്കൻവാവൽ)

Species: Hipposideros speoris (Schneider's leaf-nosed bat / ഇന്ത്യൻ ഇലമൂക്കൻവാവൽ)

Family: Megadermatidae

Genus: Megaderma

Species: Megaderma lyra (greater false vampire bat)

Species: Megaderma spasma (lesser false vampire bat / ചെറിയ നരിച്ചീർ)

Family: Molossidae

Genus: Tadarida

Species: Tadarida aegyptiaca (Egyptian free-tailed bat)

Family: Pteropodidae

Genus: Cynopterus

Species: Cynopterus brachyotis (lesser short-nosed fruit bat / ശ്വാനമുഖൻ വവ്വാൽ)

Species: Cynopterus sphinx (greater short-nosed fruit bat / കുറുമൂക്കൻ വവ്വാൽ)

Genus: Eonycteris

Species: Eonycteris spelaea (cave nectar bat / പ്രഭാത വവ്വാൽ)

Genus: Pteropus

Species: Pteropus giganteus (Indian flying fox / ഇന്ത്യൻ പഴവവ്വാൽ)

Genus: Rousettus

Species: Rousettus leschenaultii (Leschenault's rousette / മഞ്ഞച്ചുവപ്പൻ പഴവവ്വാൽ)

Family: Rhinolophidae

Genus: Rhinolophus

Species: Rhinolophus beddomei (lesser woolly horseshoe bat)

Species: Rhinolophus lepidus (Blyth's horseshoe bat)

Species: Rhinolophus pusillus (least horseshoe bat)

Species: Rhinolophus rouxii (rufous horseshoe bat)

Family: Vespertilionidae

Genus: Falsistrellus

Species: Falsistrellus affinis (chocolate pipistrelle)

Genus: Harpiocephalus

Species: Harpiocephalus harpia (lesser hairy-winged bat)

Genus: Kerivoula

Species: Kerivoula picta (painted bat / ചിത്രവാവ്വൽ)

Genus: Myotis

Species: Myotis horsfieldii (Horsfield's bat)

Species: Myotis montivagus (Burmese whiskered bat)

Genus: Pipistrellus

Species: Pipistrellus ceylonicus (Kelaart's pipistrelle / സിലോൺ അടക്കവാവൽ)

Species: Pipistrellus tenuis (least pipistrelle / കുഞ്ഞൻ അടക്കവാവൽ)

Genus: Scotozous

Species: Scotozous dormeri (Dormer's bat)

Genus: Scotophilus

Species: Scotophilus heathii (greater Asiatic yellow bat)

Species: Scotophilus kuhlii (lesser Asiatic yellow bat)

Genus: Tylonycteris

Species: Tylonycteris pachypus (lesser bamboo bat)

Order: Eulipotyphla

Family: Erinaceidae

Genus: Paraechinus

Species: Paraechinus nudiventris (bare-bellied hedgehog / ഇത്തിൾപന്നി)

Family: Soricidae

Genus: Feroculus

Species: Feroculus feroculus (Kelaart's long-clawed shrew / സിലോൺ നച്ചെലി)

Genus: Suncus

Species: Suncus dayi (Day's shrew / കാട്ടു നച്ചെലി)

Species: Suncus dayi (Etruscan shrew)

Species: Suncus murinus (Asian house shrew / വീട്ടു നച്ചെലി)

Species: Suncus niger (Indian highland shrew)

Order: Lagomorpha

Family: Leporidae

Genus: Lepus

Species: Lepus nigricollis (Indian hare / കാട്ടുമുയൽ)

Order: Pholidota

Family: Manidae

Genus: Manis

Species: Manis crassicaudata (Indian pangolin / ഈനാമ്പേച്ചി)

Order: Primates

Family: Cercopithecidae

Genus: Macaca

Species: Macaca radiata (bonnet macaque / നാടൻ കുരങ്ങ്)

Species: Macaca silenus (lion-tailed macaque / സിംഹവാലൻ കുരങ്ങ്‌)

Genus: Semnopithecus

Species: Semnopithecus hypoleucos (black-footed grey langur / കരിംകയ്യൻ കുരങ്ങ്)

Species: Semnopithecus priam (tufted grey langur / തൊപ്പിഹനുമാൻ കുരങ്ങ്)

Genus: Trachypithecus

Species: Trachypithecus johnii (Nilgiri langur / കരിങ്കുരങ്ങ്)

Family: Lorisidae

Genus: Loris

Species: Loris lydekkerianus (grey slender loris / കുട്ടിത്തേവാങ്ക്)

Order: Proboscidea

Family: Elephantidae

Genus: Elephas

Species: Elephas maximus indicus (Indian elephant / ഇന്ത്യൻ ആന)

Order: Rodentia

Family: Hystricidae

Genus: Hystrix

Species: Hystrix indica (Indian crested porcupine / മുള്ളൻ പന്നി)

Family: Muridae

Genus: Bandicota

Species: Bandicota bengalensis (lesser bandicoot rat / തുരപ്പനെലി)

Species: Bandicota indica (greater bandicoot rat / പെരുച്ചാഴി)

Genus: Golunda

Species: Golunda ellioti (Indian bush rat / ഗോളുണ്ട എലി)

Genus: Madromys

Species: Madromys blanfordi (Blanford's rat / വെള്ളവാലൻ എലി)

Genus: Mus

Species: Mus booduga (little Indian field mouse / ചെറുചുണ്ടെലി)

Species: Mus famulus (servant mouse / കാട്ടുചുണ്ടെലി)

Species: Mus musculus (house mouse / ചുണ്ടെലി)

Species: Mus platythrix (flat-haired mouse / മുള്ളൻ ചുണ്ടെലി)

Genus: Rattus

Species: Rattus norvegicus (brown rat / തവിടൻ എലി)

Species: Rattus ranjiniae (Kerala rat / നെല്ലെലി)

Species: Rattus rattus (black rat / കറുത്ത എലി)

Species: Rattus satarae (Sahyadris forest rat / സഹ്യാദ്രി കാട്ടെലി)

Genus: Tatera

Species: Tatera indica (Indian gerbil / കംഗാരു എലി)

Genus: Vandeleuria

Species: Vandeleuria nilagirica (Nilgiri long-tailed tree mouse / വാലൻ ചുണ്ടെലി)

Family: Platacanthomyidae

Genus: Platacanthomys

Species: Platacanthomys lasiurus (Malabar spiny dormouse / മുള്ളെലി)

Family: Sciuridae

Genus: Funambulus

Species: Funambulus palmarum (Indian palm squirrel / അണ്ണാറക്കണ്ണൻ)

Species: Funambulus sublineatus (Nilgiri striped squirrel / കുഞ്ഞൻ അണ്ണാൻ )

Species: Funambulus tristriatus (jungle palm squirrel / കാട്ടുവരയണ്ണാൻ)

Genus: Petaurista

Species: Petaurista philippensis (Indian giant flying squirrel / പാറാൻ)

Genus: Petinomys

Species: Petinomys fuscocapillus (Travancore flying squirrel / കുഞ്ഞൻ പാറാൻ)

Genus: Ratufa

Species: Ratufa indica (Indian giant squirrel / മലയണ്ണാൻ)

Species: Ratufa macroura (grizzled giant squirrel / ചാമ്പൽ മലയണ്ണാൻ)

Order: Scandentia

Family: Tupaiidae

Genus: Anathana

Species: Anathana ellioti (Madras treeshrew / മരനച്ചെലി)

Order: Sirenia

Family: Dugongidae

Genus: Dugong

Species: Dugong dugon (dugong / കടൽപ്പശു)

References
Nameer, P. O. (2015). "A checklist of mammals of Kerala, India". Journal of Threatened Taxa. 7 (13): 7971–7982. 
Nameer, P. O. (2016). "Checklist of Marine Mammals of Kerala". Journal of Threatened Taxa. 8 (1): 8417–8420. 
Kumarran, R. P. (2012). "Cetaceans and cetacean research in India". Journal of Cetacean Research and Management. 12 (2): 159–172.

Kerala
Mammals
Mammals